Promising Young Woman (Original Motion Picture Soundtrack) is the soundtrack album to the 2020 film Promising Young Woman, directed by Emerald Fennell, which was released on December 4, 2020, by Capitol Records. The album features a compilation of varied genres—pop, jazz, soul, and funk—performed by Charli XCX, Cyn, Fletcher, Paris Hilton, Donna Missal, and Maya B, among several others. The album consists of four covers, four original tracks, and previously unreleased tracks from artists Muna and Blessus, apart from the usage of incorporated tracks. Anthony Willis, who composed the film score, also performed the re-imagined orchestral version of the track Britney Spears' single "Toxic". It was originally scheduled for an April 2020 release, but was delayed due to the COVID-19 pandemic.

The album features mostly songs sung by female artists, while also having the involvement of female music creatives, working behind the soundtrack. According to Vice, "the film expertly uses femme pop songs to underscore its critically acclaimed twisted tale of trauma and revenge". Susan Jacobs supervised the film's soundtrack, with Willis and Fennell compiling the tracks in the album. Cyn's original track "Drinks" was released as a first single during March 2020, in anticipation with the album and film's April release. The other tracks: "Nothing's Gonna Hurt You Baby", "Uh-Oh", "Come and Play With Me", "Last Laugh" and "It's Raining Men" were subsequently released on October 20, November 13, 23, December 1 and 3, respectively.

Critics praised the use of pop music, and the selective use of female artists in the soundtrack. Despite being initially shortlisted for Best Compilation Soundtrack for Visual Media at the 64th Annual Grammy Awards, it could not get selected.

Production

Background 
Fennell explained that, she grew up listening to the soundtracks of Romeo + Juliet, Clueless, Can't Hardly Wait and Empire Records, during her childhood, which led her through a wide range of emotions, including love, heartbreak, humiliation, etc. For her directorial debut, which is a thriller, she decided to have several pop songs in the soundtrack, and insisted Susan Jacobs, to supervise the soundtrack. Fennell, who was the executive soundtrack producer, had jointly compiled the album with score composer Anthony Willis.

Jacobs stated the soundtrack had similarities, to her work in Little Miss Sunshine, where "the tone and color of what you see onscreen belies the darkness of what is transpiring". Fennell curated the soundtrack, consisting of the songs she listened, during the scripting process, and sent the playlist to Carey Mulligan. Fennell used the Paris Hilton song "Stars Are Blind" (2006) as an integral part of the script, which played as Cassie (Mulligan) and Ryan (Bo Burnham) sings the song in a pharmacy. Excerpts from Jacob's interview to Vulture stated: "It was great because it had sincerity to it. Nobody was making fun. It was about that character falling in love with a guy who was so confident in his masculinity that he felt comfortable enough to sing one of her favorite pop songs." The song was shot in the minimal budget allotted after the film's shooting being completed. Mulligan stated in an interview to Vice, saying "Everyone knows the song, but the lyrics are actually really difficult to learn because they're quite abstract".

Charli XCX's song "Boys" was an initial part of the script. Jacobs said about filming the song "The way she shot it with crotch shots all over, it's hysterical!" Droeloe's remix version of the song was featured in the soundtrack. Other lesser known artists and their songs include Fletcher's "Last Laugh", DeathbyRomy's original track "Come and Play With Me" and the cover version of The Weather Girls' single "It's Raining Men", Juice Newton's "Angel of the Morning", the cover of the 1967 song by Chip Taylor, amongst several others. In the first version of the script, Mulligan had sung her version of "Can't Help The Way I Feel", but was not used in the soundtrack, instead it was credited to the band Lily & Madeleine.

Development 

Two of the original songs were written by Cyn, who said in an interview to Variety, "Being able to see the whole movie and the scene with the music muted can be such a gift if you know what you want to do with the music. It's like coloring in the lines of a coloring book. Just like with 'Drinks,' the songs couldn't have come to life as quickly as they did without seeing the movie. And if you listen to 'Uh Oh,' the whole movie is in the second verse."

Willis, apart from composing the score, had recorded the orchestral version of Britney Spears' "Toxic". For the track, he used a string quartet arrangement and slowed down the track liner, to get a "disconnect of a song that you normally associate being really fun in a very unpleasant setting". He claimed about the lyrical connection, that "one does not understand the lyrics, but instead it gets through one's head".

In addition to having female artists, mostly contributing to the soundtrack, the album also had the involvement of prominent female music executives, creative heads and technicians on board. Jenny Swiatowy, SVP, head of creative sync at Capitol Music Group said "The film speaks to women and our experiences in the world, and the things unfortunately many of us go through. So it was important that it came from that perspective." CMG Chief Executive Anton Monstead, said to Variety: "I'm excited by this album because it's a strong body of work by a very broad spectrum of really strong female voices, and it was an exciting collaboration [...] To be taken on that journey by Emerald, who as a director really set the bar very high, it was very exciting to try and fulfill that ambition."

Release

Singles 
Cyn's original track "Drinks" was released as a promotional music video single on March 6, 2020, through YouTube. It was first released from the album as a single, in anticipation with the April 2020 release date. Speaking about the track Cyn opined that the song "and the movie complement one another thematically. For example, both pieces reveal moments of friendship, allegiance, hardship, strength, and of course, pose scenarios where drinks are acquired [...] Upon watching the movie, Promising Young Woman, I felt more inspired to finish my song. The chorus was written before I saw the movie, and the verses were written in consideration of the movie—knowing that may make a listening experience a little more interesting."

The first track "Nothing's Gonna Hurt You Baby" was released as a single on October 20. The track is a cover version of Cigarettes After Sex's 2012 album I., performed by Donna Missal, and was earlier featured in the first trailer of the film released in December 2019. Another original track "Uh-Oh" and its music video was released on November 13. The second song "Come and Play With Me" rendered by DeathByRomy was released as a single on November 23. The video-format of the third single, "Last Laugh" performed and featured Fletcher, was released on December 1 through YouTube, while the audio was released on the same day. Prior to the soundtrack's release, DeathByRomy's second song—the cover version of The Weather Girls' 1982 single "It's Raining Men"—was released on December 3.<ref>{{Cite web |title=It's Raining Men – from Promising Young Woman (Original Motion Picture Soundtrack) |url=https://www.shazam.com/track/509472782/its-raining-men-from-promising-young-woman-soundtrack |access-date=2022-05-21 |website=Shazam}}</ref>

 Album 
 Standard release 
The track list for Promising Young Woman (Original Motion Picture Soundtrack) was released on March 6, 2020, by Variety, and the album was scheduled for an April 3 release. The release was halted, as the film's originally scheduled release date of April 17, was deferred ultimately due to the COVID-19 pandemic lockdown. The soundtrack was digitally released on December 4, 2020, by Capitol Records. On October 26, pre-orders for the soundtrack re-started officially on the website of Amazon, and the album was through CD formats on December 25, coinciding with the film's release. The cover art for Universal Music Group's announcement of April 3 soundtrack release, was different from the current album artwork.

 Track listing 

 Vinyl release 
Two vinyl editions of the soundtracks (double-disc sets) were released by Capitol. The first editions, a red-and-pink colored splatter, featuring the original cover artwork and red-and-pink disc sets was released on February 19, 2021. A multi-colored splatter edition, featured the initially released cover artwork and a multi-colored disc, was released on March 19.

 Reception 
 Critical reception 
Kate Mcland of IndieWire stated, "The film is filled with inspired soundtrack choices – a strings-heavy take on Britney Spears' 'Toxic' teases before it reveals itself at the perfect moment, and an amusing use of an 'It's Raining Men' cover sells Fennell's pitch-black sense of humor early on." The Independent-based editors said that the "soundtrack's impactful aura exceeds its promise all the way to accomplished" and cited Hilton's single "Stars Are Blind" and Anthony Willis' orchestral interpretation of "Toxic" as the most impactful tracks from the album. Camila Barbareto of PopSugar said, "The bubblegum soundtrack acts as a mask for the movie's very serious themes, similarly to how Cassie paints on her red lipstick every night and makes men believe she's wasted, counting down the minutes to when they'll try something without consent. There is so much more lurking beneath the surface, symbolized by Cassie's own juxtaposition of sweet and harmless on the outside, ice-cold revenge on the inside (although not nearly as ice cold as the men)." Rachel West from the Alliance of Women Film Journalists commented "the Promising Young Woman soundtrack is equal parts dark, edgy female rage and catchy, lighthearted pop". Casey Cipriani of Bustle commented, "The soundtrack in Emerald Fennell's directorial debut Promising Young Woman is practically a character itself. The music that plays throughout the film is rooted in fun, bubbly pop that, along with the movie's candy-coated color schemes and frilly feminine costumes, juxtapose its extremely serious and occasionally brutal content." The Daily Beast wrote that "the use of a pop music soundtrack that could only be described as glorious…sees Fennell reveal just how astute she is at co-opting our own pop-culture expectations and biases". Refinery29 stated "the Promising Young Woman'' soundtrack is full of daring, empowering and straight-up fun tracks".

Accolades 

The soundtrack was shortlisted at the preliminary nominations for Grammy Award for Best Compilation Soundtrack for Visual Media, at the 64th Annual Grammy Awards, simultaneously with Willis' score at the Grammy Award for Best Score Soundtrack for Visual Media category, but could not get selected. The soundtrack fetched an award for Best Soundtrack Album at the 11th Hollywood Music in Media Awards, as well as a nomination in the same category at the St. Louis Film Critics Association awards in 2020.

References

External links 
 Official website
 

2020 soundtrack albums
Capitol Records albums
Comedy-drama film soundtracks
Thriller film soundtracks